The Olive Oil Commission of California (OOCC) was founded in 2014 by California olive oil farmers. It is an entity of the State of California which was established as a result of a bill introduced by Lois Wolk. The primary goal is to improve the sales of olive oil grown in California.

Grades and Standards 
The OOCC has developed its own grading and standards for olive oils from California out of its belief that the standards set by the International Olive Council were not applicable to olive oils from California. The organization collects samples of olive oils from member producers and has them tested in a laboratory in Australia for sensory and chemical analysis.

The standards have been criticized by the North American Olive Oil Association. The NAOOA claims that commission's standards fail to address product adulteration and "do not ensure authenticity or quality of the olive oil".

Board Members 
 Adam Englehardt, Kbar Farming
 Larry Maben, Maben Family LLC
 John Williams, Cal Ag Properties LLC
 Deborah Rogers, McEvoy of Marin LLC
 Jeff Colombini, Lodi Farming
 Richard Marchini, Marchini Ag
 Liz Tagami, Lucero Olive Oil
 Jim Lipman, California Olive Ranch
 Jim Etters, Seka Hills Olive Mill
 Brady Whitlow, Corto Olive LP
 Bruce Golino, Santa Cruz Olive Tree Nursery

References

External links 
 

Government of California
Olive oil
Agriculture in California